Froilan C. Baguion (born March 7, 1980) is a Filipino former professional basketball player . He was signed by Welcoat of the Philippine Basketball Association in 2006 after not being drafted in the 2006 PBA draft.

College career
Baguion was a varsity team player for the National University (NU) Bulldogs. During his stay at NU, he is a part of the team that went to their first UAAP Final Four in 2001 (a feat that won't be replicated until 2012), and a championship in the preseason Father Martin Cup in 2003. After the 2004 UAAP season, Baguion signed for the Philippine Basketball Association (PBA) Draft.

Professional career

Welcoat Dragons/Rain or Shine Elasto Painters
Baguion went undrafted in the 2005 PBA Draft, but was signed from the waiver wires by the Welcoat Dragons. In November 2007, Baguion was selected by the PBA Press Corps as their player of the week. Baguion left the Dragons, by then known as the Rain or Shine Elasto Painters, after the 2007-08 PBA season, after the team qualified for their first semifinals appearance in the 2008 PBA Fiesta Conference, losing the Barangay Ginebra Kings.

Coca-Cola Tigers
Baguion played for the Coca-Cola Tigers. In one Tigers game at the Mindanao Civic Center in Tubod, Lanao del Norte, Baguion's split free-throws with less than 8.7 seconds left gave enough cushion against the Purefoods Tender Juicy Giants to earn the Tigers a win.

San Miguel Beermen
Baguion won his first PBA crown with San Miguel Beermen in 2009. The team had American Gabe Freeman as reinforcement. It also included notable PBA stars like Danny Ildefonso and Olsen Racela.

Philippine Patriots 
Baguion won his first ABL crown with the Philippine Patriots when they clinched the 1st championship during the first season of the ASEAN Basketball League. They defeated the Satria Muda BritAma of Indonesia.

Chang Thailand Slammers
Baguion lead the Chang Thailand Slammers to its first ABL crown when they defeated the AirAsia Philippine Patriots. His play making skills and assists were too much for the Patriots. With the help of American import Jason Dixon, and Thai local superstar Attaporn Leitmalaiporn, they swept the Philippine team.

San Miguel Beermen
Froilan Baguion joined the San Miguel Beermen during the 3rd season of the Asean Basketball League. He was the starting point guard of the team until Chris Banchero arrived from injury and paper problems during the playoffs. The team reached the finals of the ABL wherein he was the main factor in their victory in game 1 when he shot that crucial 3 points and dished double digit assists. http://www.aseanbasketballleague.com/

Sports Rev Thailand Slammers
In need of a very good point guard and a play maker who will influence Thai basketball players, the Thailand Slammers under new management signed its former star point guard Froilan Baguion. Baguion lead the league in assists during that season with an average of 11 assists per game. His play-making abilities wow Thai fans and Filipino supporters of ABL. During a game against the Saigon Heat in February, Baguion dished 17 assists-an ABL record. He had numerous double-doubles in season 4 of ABL and finally had his triple-double during a game against Saigon Heat. With 10  points, 11 rebounds, and 11 assists he became the first and only player in ABL who had a triple-double.

His coach Joe Bryant were all praises for the Filipino point guard comparing him to NBA assists machines, Steve Nash and Chris Paul. He also believes that Baguion is an NBA material specially if he was younger.

With the help of American import 7'1" Chris Charles and Filipino import Tonino Gonzaga, the slammers reached the ABL playoffs but losing to eventual champions San Miguel Beermen from the Philippines.

Saigon Heat
Baguion played for Saigon Heat in the ABL, following the Slammers withdrawal from the league before the start of the 2014 season.

Mono Vampire Basketball Club
In December 2015, Baguion was signed by the Mono Vampire Basketball Club in the middle of the 2015–16 ABL season.

References

1980 births
Living people
Point guards
Philippine Patriots players
Philippines men's national basketball team players
Filipino men's basketball players
NU Bulldogs basketball players
People from Navotas
Basketball players from Metro Manila
Rain or Shine Elasto Painters players
Powerade Tigers players
San Miguel Beermen players